The Anchorage Museum is a large art, history, ethnography, ecology and science museum located in a modern building in the heart of Anchorage, Alaska.  It is dedicated to studying and exploring the land, peoples, art and history of Alaska.

The museum displays material from its permanent collection, along with regular visiting exhibitions.

History
The museum opened in 1968 in a  building with an exhibition of 60 borrowed Alaska paintings, a collection of 2500 historic and ethnographic objects, and a staff of two. It was designed by Mitchell/Giurgola Architects. First accredited in 1973, the museum has maintained its accreditation since. In 1992, the museum became the home for the Alaska office of the Smithsonian's NMNH Arctic Studies Center, which supports the museum's mission through research, education, and exhibitions.

Service
The Anchorage Museum is "a world-class museum located in the heart of Alaska's largest city". It welcomes over 180,000 annual visitors from Alaska and from around the world and serves as a cultural center for the community.  The museum is repeatedly ranked among Alaska's top ten visitor attractions. Each year it presents 16–20 changing exhibitions complemented by education programs and activities. In 2006, 20,993 students and 47,836 adults participated in education programs.

Permanent exhibits include an Alaska history gallery, Alaska art galleries, the Imaginarium Discovery Center science galleries and the Smithsonian Arctic Studies Center, which features Alaska Native artifacts on long-term loan from the Smithsonian Institution.

The museum's library/archives are in frequent demand by publishers, scholars, and other researchers for its information and images.  Titles held in the library are accessible to students, scholars and the public via interlibrary loan on the web.

The Smithsonian Institution's Arctic Studies Center conducts public programs and collaborative research programs to increase understanding of northern peoples, cultures and environments.  It develops exhibitions and offers professional museum training workshops frequented by museum and cultural center personnel from across the state.

Geographic area served
The museum serves its statewide mission by organizing and presenting programs and exhibitions in Anchorage, as well as by traveling exhibitions throughout the state.  Examples include exhibits shared with museums in Unalaska, Bethel, Homer, Ketchikan, Kenai, Fairbanks, Kodiak, Eek and Juneau.

The museum provides professional recommendations on collections, exhibitions, education, archival organization and conservation to other Alaska museums, cultural centers and the public.

Permanent collection
The Anchorage Museum has over  devoted to its permanent collection with a focus on Alaska history, Art of the North and Ethnography.

Alaska Gallery
 
This gallery is devoted to Alaska's rich history from the native fauna through the time of the first early migrations to the present. The Alaska Gallery exhibits more than 1,000 objects and is one of the most complete presentations of Alaskan history and ethnology. Full-scale and miniature dioramas give insight into the lifestyles of Alaska's Native peoples, exploration and settlement by the Russians, the gold rush era, World War II and statehood in 1959.

Art of the North
The permanent art collection represents the vast range of art from Alaska and the circumpolar North. Seven galleries on the museum's ground floor are devoted to this collection. Exhibits include landscape paintings, drawings from early European expeditions to Alaska, works by contemporary artists, and an entire gallery of paintings by Sydney Laurence, perhaps Alaska's best known artist.

Exhibitions and programs
Exhibitions include juried shows, interpretive exhibitions and traveling exhibitions from other museums. The museum provides a substantial range of exhibits and programs that acquaint Alaskans with the art, culture, history and science of other peoples and places. In recent years, the museum has presented "Wrapped in Pride: Ghanaian Kente and African American Identity", "Tibet: Mountains and Valleys, Castles and Tents", "Woven Treasure: The Coverlets of Norway", and several exhibitions of Korean and Japanese ceramics.  The museum also seeks to ensure that its Alaska-focused programming and exhibitions represent the diversity of immigrant heritages in Alaska and the Far North.  Public programs include lectures, classes, workshops, films, public and school tours, and special events.

Governance
The museum is operated by the Anchorage Museum Association, a private non-profit organization under a long-term contract with the Municipality of Anchorage.  Its annual budget comes from earned income, fundraising and grants, and from the municipality. The municipality owns the museum facility and collections.  The Anchorage Museum Foundation, a 501(c)(3) functionally integrated supporting organization, manages the permanent endowment and oversees the expansion project.

Staff
There are about 50 FTE staff members and they are organized into the following departments: Administration, Information Technology, Building Operations, Collections, Library and Resource Center, Curatorial, Development, Exhibitions, Design, Learning and Engagement, Marketing & Public Relations, Community Outreach, Visitor Services, and Arctic Studies.  The onsite personnel for the Smithsonian's Arctic Studies Center include an archeologist and an anthropologist. The museum relies on a robust volunteer program. Over 300 volunteers work as docents and in education, collections, exhibits and library/archives.

Facilities

The museum's 170,000 square feet (16,000 m2) include galleries for interpretive exhibitions of its permanent collection and galleries for changing exhibitions. A large atrium, two classrooms and a 230-seat auditorium host a wide variety of programs, classes and special events. Back-of-house includes exhibit prep workshops, collections storage, and workspace, including a conservation laboratory.

Expansion
The new wing features the Smithsonian Institution's Arctic Studies Center, through which 600 Alaskan Native artifacts have returned to Alaska from the National Museum of Natural History and the National Museum of the American Indian for a long-term installation. There also are new galleries for changing exhibitions, an expanded library/archives, and improved visitor services, including Muse restaurant and a gift shop.

The new extension to the museum was planned by David Chipperfield Architects Ltd., London. It created a new entrance and appearance for the whole museum by implementing a highly unique façade and building set-up. The façade was custom designed and supplied by Overgaard Ltd., Hong Kong to Architectural Wall Systems of West Des Moines, Iowa, a speciality glazing contractor. The scope of materials for this one-of-a-kind façade includes approx. 5900 m2 of custom insulated fritted glass. This glazing type and pattern has never before been used and was specially developed for the project by both Architectural Wall Systems and Overgaard Ltd. To meet the extreme environmental conditions the insulated glass units are 24 mm thick. The outside sheet is tempered 6 mm low-iron sheer with a silver mirror frit. The inside sheet is 6 mm low-iron clear sheet. The frit is silver reflective on one side and metallic on the other. All glass units were pre-assembled prior to shipping to allow for easy installation.

References

External links
 Anchorage Museum
 Overgaard Ltd. / Facade Design & Supply

Museums in Anchorage, Alaska
Institutions accredited by the American Alliance of Museums
Buildings and structures under construction in the United States
History museums in Alaska
Art museums and galleries in Alaska
Native American museums in Alaska
Smithsonian Institution museums
Museums established in 1968
1968 establishments in Alaska
NASA Museum Alliance